Niko-Mihkal Valkeapää (born 30 December 1968 in Enontekiö, Finland) is a Sami musician, joiker (Sami folk singer), teacher, actor and politician.

Biography 

He has been described as "one of Sami music's foremost performers." Valkeapää has been living in Kautokeino, Norway since 1990. He is godson of Sami artist and joiker Nils-Aslak Valkeapää.

He won the Sámi Grand Prix (1994, 1995), received the Spellemann award in 2003 (open class) with his debut album, and the Liet Ynternasjonaal award, the international music prize for minority music. He has toured across Norway, including the Nattjazz festival in Bergen, and the Northern Norway music festival Riddu Riđđu in Manndalen, Norway.  His work has been considered part of the "third wave" of modern Sami music culture, which he has done much work on, among others Georg Buljo.

Awards
In 2005, Valkeapää received the Áillohaš Music Award, a Sámi music award conferred by the municipality of Kautokeino and the Kautokeino Sámi Association to honor the significant contributions the recipient or recipients has made to the diverse world of Sámi music.

Discography 
Niko Valkeapää, Duippidit, 2003
Sierra, Duippidit, 2004
Birrat birra, Duippidit, 2008
Gusto, Duippidit, 2012
ÄÄ, Duippidit, 2012
Ráfi - Tranquility, Duippidit, 2015
Gáldu - Source, Duippidit, 2019

Also appears on
Beginner's Guide to Scandinavia, 3CD-set, Nascente 2011

References

External links

  A study of Riddu Riddu Festivála and its role as a cultural tool for ethnic revitalization Riddu Riddu, Joik or rock-n-roll?
  Music Information Centre Norway; Niko Valkeapää: Niko Valkeapää, Listen to Norway continues with Niko Valkeapää: Niko Valkeapää
  Niko Valkeapää Folkelarm 2008

1968 births
Finnish Sámi people
Living people
People from Enontekiö
Finnish Sámi musicians
Áillohaš Music Award winners
Spellemannprisen winners
People from Kautokeino